Francisco Marcos Valentin (born February 24, 1976) is a Brazilian football player.

References
jsgoal.jp

1976 births
Living people
Brazilian footballers
Brazilian expatriate footballers
J1 League players
Kyoto Sanga FC players
Expatriate footballers in Japan
Clube de Regatas Brasil players
Criciúma Esporte Clube players
Avaí FC players
Madureira Esporte Clube players
Ceará Sporting Club players
Association football forwards